Lumpkins Fork is a stream in Cass and Jackson County in the U.S. state of Missouri. It is a tributary of Little Blue River.

The stream headwaters arise in northern Cass County at  approximately 1.5 miles north of Raymore and flows north-northwest into Jackson County.

Lumpkins Fork has the name of the local Lumpkin family.

See also
List of rivers of Missouri

References

Rivers of Cass County, Missouri
Rivers of Jackson County, Missouri
Rivers of Missouri